The 2017 RAN Women's Sevens will be the thirteenth tournament of the RAN Women's Sevens, the official rugby sevens continental championships organized by RAN. Both the women's and men's competitions were held at Campo Marte in Mexico City on 25–26 November 2017.

Seven national teams will take part in a two-day round robin tournament. The winner will be eligible to participate in the 2018 Rugby World Cup Sevens.

Standings
All times are Central Standard Time (UTC−06:00)

See also
 2018 Rugby World Cup Sevens qualifying – Women
 2017 RAN Sevens (men)

References

External links
 Tournament page

2017
2017 rugby sevens competitions
2017 in North American rugby union
2017 in women's rugby union
International rugby union competitions hosted by Mexico
rugby union
rugby union
2017 in Mexican women's sports